Erythrolamprus guentheri, Günther's false coral snake, is a species of snake in the family Colubridae. The species is found in Ecuador and Peru.

References

Erythrolamprus
Reptiles of Ecuador
Reptiles of Peru
Reptiles described in 1883
Taxa named by Samuel Garman